Tomfoolery (or Tom Foolery) is a musical revue based on the songs of American satirist Tom Lehrer.

Devised and produced by Cameron Mackintosh, it premiered in London at the Criterion Theatre, directed by Gillian Lynne, on 5 June 1980, where it had a successful run. It subsequently opened on December 14, 1981 Off-Broadway at the Top of the Gate in Greenwich Village, New York, where it ran for 120 performances. The cast included Jonathan Hadary.  Lehrer himself was brought in as a consultant.

The revue features 28 of Lehrer's satirical songs that were written in the 1950s and 1960s, known for their "witty naughtiness".  Stage directions suggest each actor use their own name and wait onstage in a bar area while the others perform.

Two cast recordings have been released, one by the original London cast (Robin Ray, Jonathan Adams, Martin Connor and Tricia George), the other much rarer one by the Canadian cast.

Song list

Act 1
Be Prepared
Poisoning Pigeons In The Park
I Wanna Go Back To Dixie 
My Home Town 
Pollution 
Bright College Days 
Fight Fiercely, Harvard
The Elements
The Folk Song Army 
In Old Mexico 
She's My Girl 
When You Are Old And Gray 
Wernher Von Braun 
Who's Next?  
I Got It From Agnes 
National Brotherhood Week

Act 2
So Long, Mom (A Song For World War III)
The Hunting Song 
The Irish Ballad 
Smut  
New Math 
Silent E
George Murphy 
Oedipus Rex 
I Hold Your Hand In Mine
The Masochism Tango 
The Old Dope Peddler
The Vatican Rag 
We Will All Go Together When We Go 

The following two songs are optional:
Send The Marines 
The Wiener Schnitzel Waltz

References

External links

"TOMFOOLERY" recording

1980 musicals
West End musicals
Revues